James Franklin Oldham, better known as Jim O'Brien (November 20, 1939 – September 25, 1983), was an American newscaster.

Biography
He was born in Galveston in 1939. He married Sandra Jo Hauck in a small ceremony in Texas. They had two daughters: actress Peri Gilpin (born Peri Kay Oldham), who played the character Roz Doyle on the television program Frasier, and Patti Jo Wynne (née Oldham), who married Shannon Wynne.

According to Peri, he wished to become a pastor and was a theologian who studied at Baylor University.

After short stints at radio stations KHJ in Los Angeles and WOR-FM in New York City, he came to Philadelphia in 1970 to become a disc jockey at radio station WFIL.

Around 1973, he joined the WPVI-TV Channel 6 Action News team as a sports anchor. He soon became the weatherman, and eventually co-anchored the 12:00PM and 5:00PM newscasts, the local edition of Dialing for Dollars, and the weekend magazine show Primetime.

O'Brien was beloved for his humor and the unique, fun-loving personality that he brought to his newscasts and weather reporting. He had two favorite hobbies: motorcycle riding and skydiving. The latter hobby led to his death in a skydiving accident on September 25, 1983 at the United Parachute Club near Gilbertsville, Pennsylvania. He and another skydiver jumping with him deployed their main parachutes. During their descent, under their open parachutes, they collided with each other and their parachutes became entangled. After they tried unsuccessfully to detach themselves from each other, O'Brien, an experienced skydiver, performed a standard skydiving emergency procedure called a "cutaway". He jettisoned his main parachute and deployed his reserve parachute. However, by the time he performed the maneuver, he was already at such a low altitude that he struck the ground before his reserve canopy was able to inflate. The other jumper managed to use the entangled main parachutes to land safely.

O'Brien was posthumously inducted into the Broadcast Pioneers of Philadelphia Hall of Fame in 1997.

References

External links
 http://www.nj.com/printer/printer.ssf?/base/news-10/1102674018112440.xml
 http://www.famous56.com/jim/
 http://www.angelfire.com/celeb/JLeeves/periin.htm
 http://aicommand.com/Obrien121704.htm
 http://www.broadcastpioneers.com/bp4/obrien.html

Accidental deaths from falls
Accidental deaths in Pennsylvania
American skydivers
Parachuting deaths
American television journalists
People from Galveston, Texas
People from Waco, Texas
Television anchors from Philadelphia
Philadelphia television reporters
Weather presenters
1939 births
1983 deaths
American male journalists
Journalists from Texas
20th-century American journalists